ION LMD system is one of the laser microdissection systems and a name of device that follows Gravity-Assisted Microdissection method, also known as GAM method. This non-contact laser microdissection system makes cell isolation for further genetic analysis possible. It is the first developed laser microdissection system in Asia.

History 

At first, proto type of ION LMD system was developed in 2004.
The first generation of ION LMD was developed in 2005 and then the second generation(so-called G2) was developed in 2008. At last, the third generation(so-called ION LMD Pro) was developed in 2012.

Manufacturer 

JungWoo F&B was founded in 1994, and offers various factory automation products for clients in semiconductor, consumer electronics, LCD, automotive manufacturing and ship-building industries. In 2003, the company entered the bio-mechanics business for the medical laboratory market and developed an ION LMD system which is utilized in cancer research.

Awards 

This ION LMD system has got some reliable awards.

2005 Excellent Machine by Ministry of Commerce, Industry and Energy, Republic of Korea
2005 Best Medical Device by Korean Medical Association
2006  New Excellent Product by Ministry of Commerce, Industry and Energy, Republic of Korea

References 

Biological techniques and tools